Kiele Michelle Sanchez (born October 13, 1977) is an American actress who starred in the A&E Network drama The Glades. Previously, she had starred as Anne Sorelli in The WB comedy-drama Related and as Nikki Fernandez on the main cast in the third season of the ABC television drama series Lost. She also starred in the DirecTV drama series Kingdom on the Audience Network.

Early life and education
Sanchez was born in Chicago. Her father, Oscar Sanchez, is a racetrack jockey agent. She is one of four children, and is of Puerto Rican and French descent. Sanchez began her acting career at Glenbard North High School in Carol Stream, Illinois, when she performed in a school production of The Grapes of Wrath. Her performance helped her overcome her stage fright, with which she struggled at the time.

Career

In 2000, Sanchez auditioned for MTV's Wanna Be a VJ contest in New York. She was selected as one of the five finalists, but did not win the competition. However, an agent who had seen her on MTV expressed interest in representing her.

After her agent recommended a move to Los Angeles, Sanchez auditioned and landed roles in the short-lived drama series That Was Then and the sitcom Married to the Kellys. In 2003, Sanchez appeared in the film Stuck on You. She joined the cast of the hit ABC show Lost for the series' third season, as Nikki Fernandez, but due to fan responses to her character, she was killed off six episodes after her first appearance. She had a recurring role on the ABC show Samantha Who?. She played a leading role in the 2008 film Insanitarium alongside Jesse Metcalfe and co-starred in the 2009 thriller A Perfect Getaway as Gina, Nick's (Timothy Olyphant) girlfriend. Sanchez's character was famously seen nude swimming near a waterfall in her first scene.

Sanchez starred in the 2010 film 30 Days of Night: Dark Days, taking over the role of Stella Oleson from Melissa George, who played her in the first film. Sanchez also starred in the DirecTV drama series Kingdom which premiered on the Audience Network in the fall of 2014. She also appears in The Glades which ran for four years.

In February 2020, she was cast as Lorna (the ex-wife of Mickey) in the CBS series The Lincoln Lawyer, which is based from the 2005 novel of the same name by Michael Connelly.

In November 2022, Sanchez joined her husband Zach Gilford in a recurring role as Sydney Voit, the wife of Gilford's character Elias Voit in Criminal Minds: Evolution.

Personal life
Sanchez was married to screenwriter and director Zach Helm from 2001 to 2008.

In 2010, Sanchez began dating actor Zach Gilford, with whom she co-starred in the ABC television pilot The Matadors. The couple became engaged in November 2011, and married on December 29, 2012. The couple also co-starred in The Purge: Anarchy. In August 2015, Sanchez announced that she and Gilford were expecting their first child, a son, that November. In October 2015, the couple announced that Sanchez had suffered a stillbirth. In November 2017, the couple had a daughter, born via surrogate.

Filmography

Film

Television

See also
 List of Puerto Ricans

References

External links

 
 StuffMagazine.com Shoot

1977 births
Actresses from Chicago
American film actresses
American actresses of Puerto Rican descent
American people of French descent
American television actresses
Living people
20th-century American actresses
21st-century American actresses